Zayandeh Rud-e Jonubi Rural District is in Sheyda District of Ben County, Chaharmahal and Bakhtiari province, Iran. At the census of 2006, its population was 5,018 in 1,247 households, when it was in the former Ben District of Shahrekord County, and before the district became a county. There were 4,833 inhabitants in 1,431 households at the following census of 2011. At the most recent census of 2016, the population of the rural district was 1,161 in 240 households, by which time it was in Sheyda District of the recently established Ben County. The largest of its three villages was Azadegan, with 789 people.

References 

Ben County

Rural Districts of Chaharmahal and Bakhtiari Province

Populated places in Chaharmahal and Bakhtiari Province

Populated places in Ben County